Bay Cities FC was an American professional soccer team based in Redwood City, California that began play in 2022 to play in the National Independent Soccer Association, in the third tier of the US soccer pyramid. The club played in NISA until August 26, when financial difficulties forced the club to prematurely end the season.

History
Bay Cities Football Club was founded in 2021 in Redwood City, California by the co-owners Anders Perez, Ivan Martinez and K.C. Watson.
During 2021 BCFC took part at the 2021 NISA Independent Cup, where they finished 3rd of the Pacific Region, just behind PDX FC and Space United FC.
Later that year the club announced Eric Bucchere as sporting director and National Independent Soccer Association accepted Bay Cities' application for the 2022 season. Bay Cities FC will become the sixth professional soccer club of Northern California after San Jose Earthquakes, Sacramento Republic FC, Oakland Roots, Monterey Bay FC and Central Valley Fuego FC.

On April 6, 2022, they defeated USL Championship side Monterey Bay FC 2–1 at PayPal Park, San Jose, in the US Open Cup.

Colors, motto and supporters
BCFC colors are gold and black, the colors of the 'Golden State' and their motto is Bridge the Bay; in fact the club's major goal is to take a professional soccer team to the 700,000 soccer fans that live in the western Bay Area, that haven't had a pro club since the San Francisco Deltas folded in 2017.

Bay Cities FC supporters group is the 'Legion del oro'.

Ground
Bay Cities FC plays their home games at Terremere Field in Redwood City, California.

Roster

References

National Independent Soccer Association teams
2021 establishments in California
Association football clubs established in 2021
Soccer clubs in the San Francisco Bay Area
Redwood City, California